Vrundavan is a 2016  Indian Marathi-language film, directed by T. L. V Prasad. It is official remake of Telugu film Brindavanam (2010).

Plot
Krish (Raqesh Bapat) is the son of a multimillionaire. He has a love interest in Pooja (Pooja Sawant), who has a friend Bhumi (Vaidehi Parashurami). Bhumi's father Bhanupratap Inamdar (Mahesh Manjrekar) wants to get her married to her cousin Kalyan (Sameer Deshpande), who is a rowdy goon, which Bhumi doesn't like. Naturally, 
Girdhar Inamdar (Ashok Saraf) her paternal grandfather bluffs to the family that she has already fallen in love with a guy in the city. Pooja helps her by renting Krish as her would-be, just to let her escape the wedding situation for the time being. He goes to the village intending to prevent the marriage using tricks. He ends up solving many problems in the village and finally putting an end to the rivalry between Bhanupratap and Bhumi's uncle (Sharad Ponkshe), leading to a happy ending.

Cast 

 Raqesh Bapat as Krish
 Pooja Sawant as Pooja
 Vaidehi Parashurami as Bhumi Inamdar
 Mahesh Manjrekar as Bhanupratap Inamdar (Bhumi's father) 
 Sharad Ponkshe as Bhumi's uncle
 Ashok Saraf as Girdhar Inamdar (Bhumi's grandfather) 
 Sameer Deshpande as Kalyan
 Bharat Ganeshpure as Daily Kumar
 Uday Tikekar
 Mohan Joshi
 Kumar Hegde
 Aarti Solanki

Soundtrack

Vrundavan's songs were composed by Amitraj and lyrics by Mandar Cholkar. The four-song album featured vocals by Harshavardhan Wavare, Avadhoot Gupte, Kasturi Wavare.

Reception 
Mihir Bhanage from The Times of India stated: "Till last year, remakes of South films were almost unheard of in the Marathi film industry but the trend which was predominantly Bollywood's so far, has caught up with Marathi filmmakers too. Vrundavan, the remake of the Telugu Brindavanam,  is the latest to join the bandwagon." He gave 2.0 points out of 5.

Ganesh Matkari of Pune Mirror described the film as "Good Acting Talent" and "Average film".

References

External links 
 

2010s Marathi-language films
2016 films
Marathi remakes of Telugu films
2016 romantic drama films
Indian romantic drama films